Ben Gilroy is an Irish political activist and conspiracy theorist. A founder and former leader of Direct Democracy Ireland, Gilroy was once a campaigner against evictions and has been described as a "serial litigant" for his multiple legal actions taken against Irish banks. During one of these court hearings, Gilroy threatened and abused the court in a written affidavit and was charged with contempt of court as a result. He was sentenced to 80 hours of community service but failed to attend. As a consequence of his failure to attend the community service, he was subsequently sentenced to 3 months' imprisonment. Gilroy has republished a number of conspiracy theories relating to the COVID-19 pandemic in Ireland.

Gilroy unsuccessfully stood for the European Parliament on a number of occasions, including in the Midlands–North-West constituency in 2014 and in the Dublin constituency for the 2019 European Parliament election. He also unsuccessfully campaigned for a seat in the Dáil in the Meath East constituency in a 2013 by-election and 2016 general election, and as a candidate with the right-wing Irish Freedom Party in the Dublin Bay North constituency at the 2020 general election.

Politics
A founding member of Direct Democracy Ireland (DDI), the party was initially led by Raymond Whitehead and contested the 2011 general election with candidates being fielded as independents. The party was formed in response to the post-2008 Irish banking crisis. Gilroy contested the 2013 Meath East by-election which was caused by the suicide of Fine Gael TD Shane McEntee. Gilroy received 1,568 first-preference votes, 6.5% of those cast. In the wake of the by-election result, Village magazine compared Gilroy to the Italian Five Star Movement leader Beppe Grillo.

He was involved with attempts to create an Irish version of the yellow vests movement. He read out a list of yellow vest demands at their first protest in Dublin and was described by some as the movement's leader, however they described themselves as a "leaderless movement".

His politics were described by The Irish Times as "populist" He has spoken out against abortion, Ireland's membership of the EU, and vaccinations. Gilroy was also involved in protests against the eviction of a family in Strokestown, County Roscommon.

Gilroy was an independent candidate for the Dublin constituency in the 2019 European elections. Following an RTÉ decision to not include him and other independent and non-party Dublin candidates in a live television debate, Gilroy brought a legal challenge against the public broadcaster to the High Court. The challenge was subsequently dismissed. On 21 May he released a campaign video in which he smashed several plasterboards spray painted with the words 'state corruption', 'constitution violations', 'stealing wealth', 'unlawful evictions' and 'RTÉ' with a hurley. It quickly went viral, getting more than 300,000 views overnight. Gilroy received 7,594 (2.09%) first-preference votes, and was eliminated on the eighth count. Following the result, he announced that he was stepping back from politics in order to spend time with his family.

In January 2020, Gilroy was announced as a candidate for the Irish Freedom Party in Dublin Bay North at the 2020 general election. Gilroy was eliminated on the 7th count, with 770 (1%) of first-preference votes.

Legal issues
On 1 November 2013, Gilroy was arrested by Gardaí in Navan and brought before Dublin High Court to face charges over alleged contempt of orders restraining trespass on a County Kildare stud farm to which receivers have been appointed. Gilroy was accused of being part of a "mob" from the Rodolphus Allen Family Private Trust which forced receivers off the €8 million stud farm.

Gilroy was a serial litigant against Allied Irish Banks which led AIB to take legal action against him in 2017 to prevent him from taking further actions. He was ordered by the court to do 80 hours of community service, which Gilroy did not complete and led to him being found in contempt of court. Gilroy was subsequently jailed for three months in January 2019. He was released on bail pending a High Court challenge to the three-month sentence, but he was ordered by the court to return to jail and complete his original sentence. He was supported by Gemma O'Doherty.

The High Court of Ireland granted AIB an Isaac Wunder order against Gilroy in 2018 for continued frivolous or vexatious cases brought against the bank ostensibly on behalf of various business associates and clients.

During 2020, Gilroy was charged, in a prosecution taken by the Standards in Public Office Commission, for failing to comply with the regulations relating to election expenses following his 2019 European Parliament campaign.

Personal life 
Gilroy is originally from Raheny, Dublin. His mother was from Westmeath and his father from Leitrim. He describes himself as uneducated, having left school after the Inter Cert and "qualified from the university of life and the other college of hard knocks". He is a former bodyguard and runs an electrical business from his home in Navan. He is married with four children.

References

Living people
Bodyguards
People from Raheny
Pseudolaw
Year of birth missing (living people)